Eduard Meron (or Edward Maron; , ; born 1938) is an Arab-Israeli former Olympic weightlifter.

He was born in Haifa, Mandatory Palestine.

Meron is an Arab-Israeli Maronite Christian, and of Lebanese descent. Meron said in 2012 that he was certain that Israeli Olympic representation, which has seen few Arabs, is determined only according to criteria: "There’s a minimum you have to meet, and if Arab athletes didn’t meet the minimum, that means that they weren’t good enough."

Weightlifting career
Meron competed for Israel at the 1960 Summer Olympics in Rome, in Weightlifting--Men's Bantamweight. He came in 18th, after lifting a total of 270 kg in his best lifts in military press, snatch, and clean & jerk.

Meron marched with the Israeli flag at the 1960 Summer Olympics opening ceremony.

References

External links
"Edward Maron", the-sports.org

1938 births
Living people
Sportspeople from Haifa
Israeli male weightlifters
Weightlifters at the 1960 Summer Olympics
Olympic weightlifters of Israel
Arab citizens of Israel
Israeli Arab Christians
Israeli Maronites
Israeli people of Lebanese descent
Sportspeople of Lebanese descent